Lu I-feng (born 25 November 1962) is a Taiwanese politician.

Lu attended the Lan Yang Institute of Technology. He was affiliated with the Kuomintang, and sat on the Legislative Yuan between 1999 and 2002, representing Yilan.

References

1962 births
Living people
Kuomintang Members of the Legislative Yuan in Taiwan
Members of the 4th Legislative Yuan
Yilan County Members of the Legislative Yuan
People from Toucheng, Yilan County, Taiwan